10 Artillery Brigade was a South African Defence Force formation designed for mass artillery barrages, mainly for the 7th South African Infantry Division or 8th South African Armoured Division, as well as an ad hoc formation during Operation Prone, when needed and detached and reattached where required. Smaller components would then be used at the battlegroup level.

History
10 Artillery Brigade was formed in Potchefstroom in 1983, when 4 Field Regiment and 14 Field Regiment were both incorporated as 4 Artillery Regiment and 14 Field Artillery Regiment. 
4 Artillery Regiment was located to the old 14 Field Regiment base where the Brigade was established. It provided the base and training facilities as well as National Servicemen gunner training between each regiment on an annual basis.

Equipment
The Brigade utilized the following equipment: 
	G5 155mm long range howitzer
	G6 155mm long range howitzer
	G2 140mm medium range howitzer
	Bateleur 127mm multiple rocket launcher
	M5 120mm heavy mortars

South West Africa and Angola

Tactical Headquarters
10 Artillery Brigade Tactical headquarters was an artillery formation created in 1988 to support the ad hoc formation of 10 SA Division which had been formed to counter the Cuban threat in south-western Angola in June 1988. It was composed of:
a tactical headquarters, 
14 Field Artillery Regiment comprising:
14 Field Artillery Regiment HQ, 
155mm G5 battery from 62 Mechanised Battalion Group,
a 140mm G2 battery from Cape Field Artillery, 
a 127 mm MRL battery from 32 Battalion, 
a 120mm mortar battery from 4 Artillery Regiment,
a meteorological section from 1 Locating Regiment,
a light workshop troop  and
a signals troop
17 Field Regiment comprising:
17 Field Regiment HQ,
a 155mm G5 Battery from 61 Mechanised Battalion Group,
a 140mm G2 Battery from 17 Field Regiment, 
another 140mm G2 Battery from Transvaal Horse Artillery,
a 127mm MRL battery from 4 Artillery Regiment, 
a meteorological section from 2 Locating Regiment, 
a light workshop troop and 
a signals troop
181 battery from 18 Light Regiment

Engagements
 Battles fought around Cuito Cuanavale
 Operation Excite/Hilti
 Operation Prone

Disbandment
10 Artillery Brigade became the basis for the South African Army Artillery Formation.

See also

Notes

References

External links

Brigades of South Africa
Disbanded military units and formations in Potchefstroom
Military units and formations established in 1983
Military units and formations of South Africa in the Border War
Military units and formations disestablished in 1992
Artillery brigades